International School in Genoa (ISG) is an international school in Genoa, Italy, serving grades preschool through 12. It was first established in 1966.

It became an International Baccalaureate school on December 11, 2000, when it introduced the IB diploma programme (for high school).

References

External links
 

Education in Genoa
Buildings and structures in Genoa
International schools in Italy
1966 establishments in Italy
Educational institutions established in 1966